Arizona Dream is a 1993 
indie  surrealist comedy drama film co-written and directed by Emir Kusturica and starring Johnny Depp, Jerry Lewis, Faye Dunaway, Lili Taylor and Vincent Gallo.

Plot
Axel has a dream about an Eskimo who catches a rare halibut and brings it back to his family in an igloo. Axel's cousin Paul coaxes Axel from his job tagging fish in New York City to Arizona to attend his uncle Leo's trophy wedding to a much younger woman. His uncle tries to persuade him to stay permanently and take over the family business of selling Cadillacs. Axel resists at first, but he decides to give it a try.

Axel encounters two strange women: Elaine, a woman who always had a dream of building a flying machine, and her stepdaughter Grace, who is jealous of Elaine and dreams of killing herself and being reincarnated as a turtle. Axel starts lusting after Elaine and decides to help make her dreams come true. As he and Elaine build the machine day by day, Grace starts destroying the contraption. Axel then rebuilds. Leo and Paul arrive at Elaine and Grace's house to encourage Axel to come back as Elaine threatens them with a shotgun. Axel and Elaine complete the machine and test it, but it crashes into a tree.

Axel then decides to put both Elaine and Grace out of their misery, but can not go through with it. Grace has the idea to play Russian Roulette with him. Axel is scared at first, but at his second turn he pulls the trigger multiple times. The gun does not fire. Axel, Elaine, and Grace come to Paul's talent show. He decides to play Cary Grant's role from North by Northwest with the famous crop duster scene. Paul receives the score of 1. Leo's fiancée then approaches them to say that there is something wrong with Leo. Axel realizes that Leo is dying and calls an ambulance.

The day before Elaine's birthday a few months later, Axel and Paul finally come back to Elaine and Grace's house. Elaine is mad at Axel for not contacting her but forgives him. The next day on Elaine's birthday, Elaine is given an airplane as a present. The four celebrate Elaine's birthday by beating a piñata, but are interrupted by a storm. As the others dry off inside, Grace remains outside to free her turtles, telling them to "Go play," Axel goes upstairs with Grace to wrap the presents where she gives Axel a globe, telling him that she wants him to have the world. Axel tells Grace that Elaine has changed and that he is not in love with her any more. He makes a promise to Grace to go to Alaska.

Axel, Elaine, Grace, and Paul talk about the manners in which they want to die. Grace says that she is going to sleep and walks upstairs, dressing herself in a white shift and a hat with a veil. As she walks outside, Axel and Elaine see her through the window and run outside in an attempt to stop her. Grace shoots herself, and a lightning bolt destroys Elaine's airplane. Sometime after Grace's death Axel breaks into Uncle Leo's abandoned Cadillac store at night and goes to sleep on top of a Cadillac with a cat that has just had her litter. The film ends with Axel and Uncle Leo as Eskimos in Axel's dream. They catch the halibut and discuss it. It flies from their hands into the sunrise.

Cast
 Johnny Depp as Axel Blackmar
 Jerry Lewis as Leo Sweetie
 Faye Dunaway as Elaine Stalker
 Lili Taylor as Grace Stalker
 Vincent Gallo as Paul Leger
 Paulina Porizkova as Millie
 Michael J. Pollard as Fabian
 Candyce Mason as Blanche
 Alexia Rane as Angie
 Polly Noonan as Betty
 Ann Schulman as Carla
 James R. Wilson as Lawyer
 Kim Keo as The Mechanical Singing Doll

Production
 Original edit as "American Dreams" was 4 hours but trimmed down to 2 hours 22 minutes for theatrical release as "Arizona Dream". Some of the cut scenes are included as bonus material on the Universal Pictures France worldwide Blu-ray.
 Many of the Arizona scenes were filmed in Douglas, Arizona, and Patagonia, Arizona
 Filming took a year due to the Director suffering a Nervous Breakdown. Johnny Depp's hair length keeps changing because of this.

The music video for the 1991 Tom Petty song, "Into the Great Wide Open", was shot during the filming of the movie.

Reception

Critical response
Arizona Dream received a generally positive response from critics, garnering an 87% rating on Rotten Tomatoes based on 15 reviews with an average score of 6.82/10.

Janet Maslin of The New York Times liked the film, praising it as "enjoyably adrift, a wildly off-the-wall reverie" and opining that its best feature is "its lunacy, which is so liberating".

Referring to Arizona Dream as "the quintessential Nuart movie", Los Angeles Times Kevin Thomas sees it as "a dazzling, daring slice of cockamamie tragicomic Americana envisioned with magic realism by a major, distinctive European filmmaker".<ref>Dazzling 'Arizona Dream' of Tragicomedy;Los Angeles Times, 11 July 1995</ref>

In his affirmative review Chicago Sun-Times' Roger Ebert called Arizona Dream "goofier than hell" while adding that "you can't stop watching it because nobody in the audience, and possibly nobody on the screen, has any idea what's going to happen next" and referring to Kusturica as "a filmmaker who has his own peculiar vision of the world that does not correspond to the weary write-by-numbers formulas of standard screenplays".

Year-end lists
 Dishonorable mention – William Arnold, Seattle Post-IntelligencerBox office
Although filmed in 1991 and released throughout Europe in 1993, Arizona Dream was not theatrically released in the U.S. until September 9, 1994. Warner Brothers initially reduced it to two hours and tried to market it for the middle-of-the-road audience; when these attempts failed, they released the full version. As a result its total U.S. gross, in three theaters, was only $112,547.

Awards
The film won the Silver Bear - Special Jury Prize at the 43rd Berlin International Film Festival.

Alternate versions
Although shown theatrically in the U.S. at its full length, the TV prints and home release versions run 119 minutes.

Home media
Warner Archives released the film on a bare bones (no extras) made to order DVD in the United States on March 16, 2010. In Europe, Studio Canal with Universal Pictures France released the film on DVD, HD DVD and a worldwide compatible Blu-ray. The Blu-ray features an interview with Johnny Depp and deleted scenes.

Soundtrack

Soundtrack was by Goran Bregović featuring the vocals and lyrics of Iggy Pop on tracks 1, 4 & 6 and the lyrics of Emir Kusturica as well as the vocals of Iggy Pop on track 10. In the film, apart from the music on soundtrack, there are also three songs of Django Reinhardt.

In popular culture
Foo Fighters front man Dave Grohl has revealed that the song "Enough Space" off of their album The Colour and the Shape is based on Arizona Dream''.

References

External links
 
 

1993 films
1990s adventure comedy-drama films
Films directed by Emir Kusturica
Films scored by Goran Bregović
American adventure comedy-drama films
Films shot in Arizona
Films shot in Colorado
Films shot in Alaska
StudioCanal films
Magic realism films
English-language French films
French comedy-drama films
Warner Bros. films
Silver Bear Grand Jury Prize winners
1990s American films
1990s French films